Khanke  (also written Khanik or Khanek) is a town located in the Simele District of the Dohuk Governorate in Kurdistan region. The town is located ca.  southwest of Dohuk.

Khanke is populated by Yazidis.

References

Populated places in Dohuk Province
Yazidi populated places in Iraq